54th Troop Command is a troop command of the New Hampshire Army National Guard.

Structure
 114th Public Affairs Detachment
 39th Army Band at Manchester
 Company C, 3rd Battatlion, 172nd Infantry Regiment (Mountain) at Milford
 160th Engineer Detachment at Concord
 237th Military Police Company
 Detachment 1 at Lebanon
 Detachment 2 at Concord
 1986th Support Detachment (CCT) at Concord

References

Military units and formations in New Hampshire
Troop Commands of the United States Army National Guard